Bone Creek is a stream located entirely within Ritchie County, West Virginia.

Bone Creek was descriptively named for the animal bones discovered along its course. The animals were attracted to a salt lick.

See also
List of rivers of West Virginia

References

Rivers of Ritchie County, West Virginia
Rivers of West Virginia